Oxylobium ellipticum, commonly known as the common shaggy-pea, is a flowering plant in the family Fabaceae.  It has dense clusters of yellow pea flowers and elliptic-shaped leaves. It grows in south-eastern Australia.

Description 
It has golden yellow pea flowers in dense terminal clusters. Pods 7–8 mm long, rounded, grey-brown, covered with the long silky hairs.

Taxonomy and naming
Oxylobium ellipticum was first formally described in 1811 by Robert Brown and the description was published in Hortus Kewensis.The specific epithet (ellipticum) refers to the shape of the leaves.

Distribution and habitat
Oxylobium ellipticum is endemic to Australia, mostly widespread in Tasmania, Victoria, New South Wales and Queensland. This species widespread in montane ecosystems and grows frequently on the skeletal soils and organic brown peat on quartzite sand.

Research Article 

This research is about the molecular phylogeny study between the species like Oxylobium, Gastrolobium, Brachysema, Jansonia, Nemica and Podolobium is presented. The study was conducted using the chloroplast DNA and nuclear ribosomal DNA. Oxylobium is shown to be polyphyletic, while Gastrobium is paraphyletic containing within it the genera Branchysema, Jansonia and Nemcia, as well as Oxylobium lineare. Molecular traits such as ovule number, fluroacetate content and different morphological was studied. The molecular analysis were compared to each other. The results support the recent monograph that expands Gastrolobium to include Jansonia, Nemica, Brachysema and Oxylobium. The revision of the leaves Oxylobium and Podolobium occurring exclusively in eastern Australia, while Gastrolobium occurs almost exclusively in south western Australia, with only two species, G. brevipes and G. grandiflorum, occurring outside the Australia.

References

Mirbelioids
Fabales of Australia
Flora of Tasmania
Flora of New South Wales
Flora of Queensland
Flora of Victoria (Australia)